Halima or Halimah or Halime and Halimeh /halima/, pronounced ha-LEE-mah, is a female given name of Arabic origin meaning forebearing, gentle, mild-mannered and generous. It may refer to:

People with the mononym
Halimah IV, also called Alimah, the sovereign Sultana regnant of the Anjouan sultanate at Nzwani in the Comoro Islands from 1788 until 1792
 Halima, mononym of American model Halima Aden

People with the given name

Halima 
Halima (princess), 6th century princess of the Ghassan kingdom
Halima Aden (born 1997), Somali-American model
Halima Ahmed, Somali political activist
Halima Bashir, author from Darfur
Halima Chehaima (born 1988), Belgian beauty queen
Halima ECheikh, later known as Naama (born 1934), Tunisian singer
Halima Ferhat (born 1941), Moroccan historian
Halima Hachlaf (born 1988), Moroccan runner
Halima Nosirova (1913-2003), Uzbek singer
Halima Tayo Alao (born 1956), Nigerian civil servant

Halimah
Halimah bint Abi Dhuayb, the prophet Muhammad's foster mother
Halimah Ali, Malaysian politician
Halimah Nakaayi (born 1994), Ugandan middle-distance runner
Halimah Mohamed Sadique (born 1962), Malaysian politician
Halimah Yacob (born 1954), President of Singapore

Halimat
Halimat Ismaila (born 1984), Nigerian athlete

Halimatu
Halimatu Ayinde (born 1995), Nigerian footballer

Halime
Halime Çavuş (1898–1976), a Turkish woman, who disguised herself as a man in order to serve in a militia during the Turkish War of Independence
Halime Hatun (died 1281), possible mother of Osman I, the founder of the Ottoman Empire
Halime Hatun (fictional character), character in Turkish TV series Diriliş: Ertuğrul, based on the alleged mother of Osman I
Halime Sultan, a consort of Sultan Mehmed III, and the mother of Sultan Mustafa I and the Valide Sultan as well as a regent of the Ottoman empire
Halime Zülal Zeren (born 1995), Turkish female swimmer

Halema
Halema Boland *born 1980), Kuwaiti famous television host

People with the middle name
Alemshah Halime Begum or Alemshah Beyim (1460-1522), an Aq Qoyunlu princess

People with the surname
Hadjé Halimé Oumar (1930-2001), Chadian activist, educator, and politician

Places
Halimeh Jan, also known as Halīmjān and Khalimdzhakh, a village in Blukat Rural District, Rahmatabad and Blukat District, Rudbar County, Gilan Province, Iran
Kawrat Halimah, a village in Yemen

Arabic feminine given names
Bosnian feminine given names